The Diocese of Cajamarca is a Latin Church ecclesiastical territory or diocese of the Catholic Church located in the city of Cajamarca, Peru. It is a suffragan diocese in the ecclesiastical province of the metropolitan Archdiocese of Trujillo.

History
 April 5, 1908: Established as Diocese of Cajamarca from the Diocese of Chachapoyas and Diocese of Trujillo

Leadership
 Bishops of Cajamarca, in reverse chronological order
 Bishop Isaac-C. Martínez Chuquizana, M.S.A. (2021.10.23 – present)
 Bishop José Carmelo Martínez Lázaro, O.A.R. (2004.10.12 – 2021.10.23)
 Bishop Ángel Francisco Simón Piorno (1995.03.18 – 2004.02.04), appointed Bishop of Chimbote
 Archbishop Matias Patrício de Macêdo (1990.07.12 – 2000.07.12)
 Bishop José Antonio Dammert Bellido (1962.03.19 – 1992.12.01)
 Bishop Nemesio Rivera Meza (1960.01.28 – 1961.07.08)
 Bishop Pablo Ramírez Taboado, SS.CC. (1947.09.05 – 1960.01.28), appointed Bishop of Huacho
 Bishop Teodosio Moreno Quintana (1940.12.15 – 1947.06.27), appointed Bishop of Huánuco
 Bishop Giovanni Giuseppe Guillén y Salazar, C.M. (1933.12.21 – 1937.09.16)
 Bishop Antonio Rafael Villanueva, O.F.M. (1928 – 1933.08.02)
 Bishop Francesco di Paolo Grozo (1910.03.21 – 1928)

See also
Roman Catholicism in Peru

Sources
 GCatholic.org
 Catholic Hierarchy

Roman Catholic dioceses in Peru
Roman Catholic Ecclesiastical Province of Trujillo
Christian organizations established in 1908
Cajamarca Region
Roman Catholic dioceses and prelatures established in the 20th century
Cajamarca
1908 establishments in Peru